Quinter is a city in Gove County, Kansas, United States.  As of the 2020 census, the population of the city was 929.

History
The city of Quinter is built at the location of an old railroad switching site called Melota.  A town named Familton was built there in 1885, consisting originally of a hotel.  The U.S. Government would not establish a post office under the Familton name, because of possible confusion with other names in the state, so another had to be chosen.  The name Quinter was settled upon, after Rev. James Quinter, a local Baptist Brethren minister.

The city has received some slight national publicity in November 2006 when longtime resident Waldo McBurney, age 104, was proclaimed the oldest worker in the United States, and in 2020.

Geography
Quinter is located at  (39.065706, -100.236828).

Demographics

2010 census
As of the census of 2010, there were 918 people, 374 households, and 251 families residing in the city. The racial makeup of the city was 98.3% White, 0.3% African American, 0.4% Asian, 0.3% from other races, and 0.7% from two or more races. Hispanic or Latino of any race were 2.2% of the population.

There were 374 households, of which 29.1% had children under the age of 18 living with them, 58.8% were married couples living together, 6.1% had a female householder with no husband present, 2.1% had a male householder with no wife present, and 32.9% were non-families. 29.9% of all households were made up of individuals, and 18.5% had someone living alone who was 65 years of age or older. The average household size was 2.30 and the average family size was 2.87.

The median age in the city was 47.9 years. 23.6% of residents were under the age of 18; 6% were between the ages of 18 and 24; 17.3% were from 25 to 44; 24.5% were from 45 to 64; and 28.6% were 65 years of age or older. The gender makeup of the city was 47.2% male and 52.8% female.

2000 census
As of the census of 2000, there were 961 people, 393 households, and 257 families residing in the city. The racial makeup of the city was 97.40% White, 0.10% African American, 0.31% Asian, 0.94% from other races, and 1.25% from two or more races. Hispanic or Latino of any race were 1.25% of the population.
There were 393 households, out of which 28.2% had children under the age of 18 living with them, 61.1% were married couples living together, 3.3% had a female householder with no husband present, and 34.4% were non-families. 33.8% of all households were made up of individuals, and 22.6% had someone living alone who was 65 years of age or older. The average household size was 2.31 and the average family size was 2.97.

In the city the population was spread out, with 24.8% under the age of 18, 4.5% from 18 to 24, 19.0% from 25 to 44, 20.2% from 45 to 64, and 31.5% who were 65 years of age or older. The median age was 46 years. For every 100 females, there were 81.3 males. For every 100 females age 18 and over, there were 74.6 males.

The median income for a household in the city was $32,098, and the median income for a family was $41,111. Males had a median income of $25,313 versus $17,292 for females. The per capita income for the city was $15,588. About 5.4% of families and 7.6% of the population were below the poverty line, including 9.8% of those under age 18 and 6.4% of those age 65 or over.

Transportation
The concurrent Interstate 70 and U.S. Route 40 pass just south of the city.  Old U.S. Route 40 and the current K-212 pass through the city, as does a major Union Pacific railroad line.

Notable people
 Brent Barrett, American actor and tenor
 Vaughn Flora, Kansas state legislator
 Scott Huffman, 1996 Olympic pole vaulter and former American record holder
 Tracey Mann, Lieutenant Governor of Kansas, 2018-2019
 Robert Maxwell, World War II combat veteran and Medal of Honor recipient
 Waldo McBurney, centenarian
 Maggie McIntosh, Maryland State legislator

See also
 Monument Rocks (Kansas)

References

Further reading

External links
 City of Quinter
 Quinter - Directory of Public Officials
 USD 293, local school district
 Quinter City Map, KDOT

Cities in Gove County, Kansas
Cities in Kansas
Populated places established in 1885
1885 establishments in Kansas